Partisan Song or Partisan's Song may refer to:

Partizaner lid (disambiguation), Yiddish World War II songs
Chant des Partisans, French World War II song
Marsz Gwardii Ludowej, Polish World War II song
Po dolinam i po vzgoriam, Russian Civil War song